Antilopen Gang (Antelope Gang) is a German hip hop group from Düsseldorf and Aachen. The group consists of the rappers Koljah, Panik Panzer and Danger Dan and produces music under their own label, Antilopen Geldwäsche. Another member of the group, NMZS (Jakob Wich), committed suicide in 2013.

History

Under the name Caught in the Crack, the musicians that later formed Antilopen Gang published parodistic gangsta rap albums in 2005 and 2008.

Antilopen Gang was founded in 2009 by the rappers Danger Dan, Koljah, NMZS and Panik Panzer. In interviews about the band's name the rappers have given several  ironic answers, such as having an inspiring dinner at a restaurant that contained antilope meat  as well as personal experiences as boy scouts.

Their first album Spastik Desaster was released at the turn of the year 2009/2010 as a free download, and the group gained national popularity through the song Fick die Uni (fuck university), which was followed by solo albums by several members.

NMZS committed suicide in March 2013. His fellow group members posthumously released his solo album Der Ekelhafte (the disgusting one).

In 2014, Antilopen Gang signed a contract with the label JKP of the popular German punk band Die Toten Hosen. In October 2014 the Single Beate Zschäpe hört U2 (Beate Zschäpe is listening to U2) was released, criticizing the phenomenon of right-wing extremism in Germany.

Aversion (2014)

On November 7, 2014, the album Aversion was released under the JKP label, and was dedicated to NMZS.

In 2015 the Band won the New Music Award as well as the VIA Award in the category "Best Newcomer" and was awarded with the political Amadeu Antonio Award. In 2015 the band recorded a song for the satirical party Partei für Arbeit, Rechtsstaat, Tierschutz, Elitenförderung und basisdemokratische Initiative (Die PARTEI) together with artists Bela B and Slime.

Anarchie und Alltag (2017)

In January 2017 the band announced that in addition to their new album Anarchie und Alltag (Anarchy and Everyday Life) a bonus album Atombombe auf Deutschland (Atom Bomb on Germany) would be released.

Anarchie und Alltag was released on January 20, immediately topping the German charts.

Abbruch Abbruch and Adrenochrom (2020) 
Their fourth studio album Abbruch Abbruch (abort abort) was released on January 24, 2020. On August 21 of the same year, without prior announcements, the band released the fifth studio album Adrenochrom (adrenochrome) which was written during the Covid-19 lockdown. It was also the first record being released by their own record label Antilopen Geldwäsche (antelope money laundering).

Antilopen Geldwäsche Sampler 1 (2021) 
On Christmas Eve 2021 the Antilopen Geldwäsche Sampler 1 was released following the single of the same name. It also contains a lot of featured guests including Max Herre, Fatoni, Zugezogen Maskulin and Bobby Fletcher.

The planned Aufbruch Aufbruch Tour (Aufbruch meaning departure, in German resembling the title of the 2020 album Abbruch Abbruch) had to be postponed until 2022 due to the restrictions of the Covid-19 pandemic.

Discography

As Antilopen Gang

Albums 
 2014: Aversion
 2015: Abwasser
 2017: Anarchie und Alltag
 2020: Abbruch Abbruch
 2020: Adrenochrom
 2021: Antilopen Geldwäsche Sampler 1

Singles and videos 
 2010: Traurige Clowns (Koljah & Danger Dan)
 2011: Motto Mobbing (Koljah & NMZS)
 2011: Kommentarfeld (Koljah & NMZS)
 2011: Egotrip (NMZS)
 2011: Viel zu viel (NMZS)
 2012: Ölsardinenindustrie (Danger Dan)
 2012: Kontaktanzeige (NMZS & Danger Dan)
 2012: So ungefähr (NMZS & Danger Dan)
 2012: Lebensmotto Tarnkappe (NMZS & Danger Dan)
 2012: Der Promomove (NMZS)
 2013: Chabos wissen wer die Uni fickt (Live)
 2013: Intro (Der Ekelhafte) (NMZS)
 2013: Sarkophag (NMZS)
 2014: Vorurteile Pt. II (Fatoni feat. Antilopen Gang & Juse Ju)
 2014: Der goldene Presslufthammer
 2014: Outlaws
 2014: Beate Zschäpe hört U2 (Single, JKP)
 2015: Verliebt
 2015: Enkeltrick
 2016: Das Trojanische Pferd
 2017: Pizza
 2017: Patientenkollektiv
 2017: Liebe Grüße (feat. (Fatoni)
 2017: Baggersee
 2019: 2013 (prod. by C.O.W. 牛)
 2019: Wünsch Dir Nix (prod. by C.O.W. 牛)
 2019: Lied gegen Kiffer
 2020: Der Ruf ist ruiniert (prod. by C.O.W. 牛)
 2020: Bang Bang
 2020: Trenn dich
 2020: Army Parka
 2021: Antilopen Geldwäsche

Free tracks 
 2013: Niemand peilt die Gang (MeinRap.de exclusive)
 2013: Leben und Streben des Friedrich Kautz
 2014: Vorurteile Pt. II (feat. Fatoni & Juse Ju)

Solo releases

Before the foundation of Antilopen Gang 
 2007: Panik & Koljah: Mut zur Blamage (EP, CD)
 2007: NMZS: Trash (EP, free download)
 2008: Koljah, NMZS & Tai Phun: L’avantgarde – Gute Sprüche 05-07 (CD)
 2008: Danger Dan: Coming Out (EP, free download)
 2008: NMZS & SZMN: Robopommes (EP, free download)

After the foundation of Antilopen Gang 
 2009: Panik, Koljah & NMZS: Spastik Desaster (CD & free download)
 2010: Koljah & Danger Dan: Traurige Clowns (EP, free download)
 2010: Koljah, NMZS & Pitlab: L’avantgarde – das Remixtape (free download)
 2010: Koljah: Publikumsbeschimpfung (CD & free download)
 2011: NMZS & Koljah: Motto Mobbing (CD & free download)
 2011: NMZS: Egotrip (EP, free download)
 2012: Danger Dan: Dinkelbrot und Ölsardinen (EP, CD & free download)
 2012: NMZS & Danger Dan: Aschenbecher (CD & free download)
 2013: NMZS: Der Ekelhafte (CD & free download)
 2014: Koljah, Panik & Danger Dan: Aversion (CD & download)
 2015: Koljah, Panik & Danger Dan: Abwasser (free download)
 2017: Koljah, Panik Panzer & Danger Dan: Anarchie & Alltag + Bonus Album "Atombombe auf Deutschland" (CD & download)

As Caught in the Crack 
 2005: Alles Vorbei
 2008: Es wird wie ein Unfall aussehen (free download)

References

External links

 Offizielle Website
 Offizieller YouTube-Kanal
 Antilopen Gang auf Laut.de

German hip hop groups